The World Turned Upside Down is a sculpture by the Turner Prize-winning artist Mark Wallinger, on Sheffield Street, London, within the campus of the London School of Economics. The name World Turned Upside Down comes from a 17th-century English ballad. It reportedly cost over £200,000, which was funded by alumni donations.

Disputed content
The artwork attracted controversy for showing the island of Taiwan as a sovereign entity, rather than as part of the People’s Republic of China. After dueling protests by students from both the PRC and ROC and reactions by third party observers (which included the President of Taiwan, Taiwanese Ministry of Foreign Affairs and the co-chairs of the British-Taiwanese All-Party Parliamentary Group in the House of Commons) the university decided later that year (2019) that it would retain the original design which chromatically displayed the PRC and ROC as different entities but with the addition of an asterisk beside the name of Taiwan and a corresponding placard that clarified the institution's position regarding the controversy.

A group of students repeatedly vandalised the globe for its omission of the state of Palestine, a non-member observer state in the United Nations.

Gallery

See also 

 Political status of Taiwan
 Sino-Indian border dispute
 Tibetan sovereignty debate
 Israeli–Palestinian conflict

References 

London School of Economics
Cross-Strait relations
Outdoor sculptures in London
Vandalized works of art in the United Kingdom
21st-century sculptures
2019 in London